James Paul Kabia (born 11 November 1954) is an English former footballer who played in the Football League for Chesterfield in 1972. He also played in the United States with the Santa Barbara Condors in the American Soccer League, before returning to England to play in the lower leagues. He is the older brother of fellow professional footballer Jason Kabia.

Career statistics

Club

Notes

References

External links
 Nuneaton Borough 1979-1991 – Part 1 (mentioned)
 Nuneaton Borough 1979-1991 – Part 2 (mentioned)

1954 births
Living people
English footballers
Association football forwards
Chesterfield F.C. players
American Soccer League (1933–1983) players
English expatriate footballers
English expatriate sportspeople in the United States
Expatriate soccer players in the United States